Apatia is one of the most popular Polish punk rock and hardcore bands, founded in 1989 in Poznań, where it played its farewell concert in May 2011. Its members actively support vegetarianism and straight edge ideology.

History
The band was created in 1989 out of another group, HCP. The first gig took place in 1990, during the independent Roberge Festival in Warsaw. It has been since then, with frequent concerts played both in Poland and other European countries, such as Germany and France. In 1993, in prestigious Polish Encyclopedia PWN, Apatia was mentioned in the article about straight edge movement.

Current lineup
 Matol - vocal
 Krzychu - drums
 Jędrek - guitar
 Stiepan - bass guitar

Former members
 Bulwa - guitar,
 Arek - guitar,
 Szymon - bass guitar.

Discography
 1993	Walka Czy Apatia (Struggle or apathy)	
 1993	Punk Floyd
 1994	Odejdz Lub Zostan (Leave or stay)
 1995	5 Piosenek o tym jak niszczymy system (Five songs about us destroying the system)
 1995	Dwa w jednym	(Two in one)
 1997	Apatia	
 2000	100% Vegetarian band	
 2002	Manipulacja (Manipulation)
 2007	Uleglosc	(Submission)

References

External links
 Band’s official page
 Apatia on youtube.com

Polish musical groups
Polish hardcore punk groups
Straight edge groups